Sauk City High School was established in Sauk City in 1877. A building was constructed for it in 1891. Alfred Clas designed a building for the high school in 1916. 

State legislator and education advocate C. C. Kuntz "lived at the school". German was "always" taught at the school. The high school was added to the National Register of Historic Places in 1989. It is at 713 Madison Street.

See also
National Register of Historic Places listings in Sauk County, Wisconsin

References

This draft is in progress as of October 18, 2022.

National Register of Historic Places in Sauk County, Wisconsin